Ernst Moritz Heinrich Bark Schultz (1858–1922), known as Ernesto Bark, was a Livonian writer, journalist and political activist based in Spain. He took part in the Bohemian scene in Madrid.

Biography 
Born on 23 March 1858 in Kaava, Laiuse, in the vicinity of Dorpart, then part of the Russian Empire. Regarding his self-identification, aside from presenting himself as a Livonian, he declared to have three nationalities: "the German one from an ethnographic standpoint, the Russian one from a political standpoint (and unfortunately) and the Spanish one because of affection and love". In any case, he also contextually self-identified as a Baltic German in his writings. He even declared to be "Polish" on some occasions. Pío Baroja dubbed him as a "Latvian revolutionary". He took studies in Riga, Leipzig, Munich and Berlin. 

Involved in Baltic nationalist propaganda, he founded the clandestine newspaper Der Baltische Föderalist in Switzerland in 1883, whose success reportedly led to a deportation to Siberia. He settled in Spain circa 1884 (after a previous brief stay in 1882). Prior to his settlement in Madrid, he lived for a time in Alicante. He also earned a living in Spain as teacher of foreign languages. During his time in Madrid, he supported along his friend  Jewish immigrants coming from Russia. A noted polemicist vis-à-vis his political activity, espousing republican-socialist ideas, Bark held feuds with Pablo Iglesias Posse and Juan Montseny Carret (Federico Urales). A close acquaintance of Alejandro Sawa, the character Basilio Soulinake in Ramón María del Valle-Inclán's Luces de bohemia is based on Bark.

He became a member of the Radical Party circa 1910. Several tentative death dates, ranging from 1914 to 1924 have been reported in sources. He actually died in his home in Madrid located at Calle de Ayala 57 on 24 October 1922, as it is reported in several obituaries published in newspapers such as La Libertad or El Liberal.

References 
Citations

Bibliography
 
 
 
 
 
 
 
 

Baltic-German people
Spanish journalists
1922 deaths
1858 births
People from Livonia